is a Japanese Naoki Award-winning author.

Life 
The daughter of the chief priest of Yoyogi Hachiman shrine, Hiraiwa Yumie was born in Tokyo in 1932. After graduating from the Department of Japanese Literature at Japan Women's University, the aspiring author studied under novelist Togawa Yukio and became a member of Shinyo-kai, an organization to promote literature established in memory of novelist Hasegawa Shin. In 1959, her work Taganeshi (A Sword Name-Engraver) won the Naoki Award.

Works 
Her representative works include the historical detective-story series Onyado Kawasemi (The Kawasemi Inn). Her works cover a wide range of genres, including historical and contemporary novels, mysteries, novels on adolescence and scripts for plays and TV dramas. In 1987, she became a member of the selection committee for the Naoki Award.

References

External links
 J'Lit | Authors : Yumie Hiraiwa* | Books from Japan 
 Yumie Hiraiwa:books by Yumie Hiraiwa

1932 births
Japanese writers
Living people
Recipients of the Order of Culture
Japan Women's University alumni